Vlodko (Vladimir) Kaufman (born March 2, 1957, in Karaganda, Kazakhstan) is a Ukrainian artist of German descent, painter, graphic artist, performer, author of many art projects, and participant in solo and group exhibitions.

Biography 

Vlodko Kaufman studied at the Lviv School of Applied and Decorative Arts named after Ivan Trush in 1974-1978. He studied at the Lviv Polytechnic Institute, majoring in architecture in 1978-1980. Kaufman received first prize, in painting, "Autumn Meetings" from Lviv Art Gallery in 1986. He worked in the variety theater "Don't be sad!" as artist in residence in 1988. In 1989-1993, he was a member of the art society "The Way" and participated in its group exhibitions in Lviv, Kharkiv, Lublin and Krakow. In 1992, he was the main artist of the "Vyvyh" festival. In 1993, he was the main artist of the festival "Ukrainian Youth of Christ". In 1993, he became a co-founder of the artistic association "Dzyga". He was its art director. In 1993, he presented the opening "Letters to Earthlings, or the Eighth Seal" in the Lviv Art Gallery, as well as the exhibition and installation "Incomprehensible Ruin".

In 2005-2006, his painting "Disposal of Nostalgia*" was installed in "Dzyza" (the coffee shop "Under the Hourglass").
He became a co-founder of the Institute of Modern Art in 2007. In 2008, the performances "Home Excursion" and "Sacred Poltva" as part of the "Art-Depot" project (Lviv), the performance "Declaration of Emptiness" as part of the "GogolFest" festival (Kyiv), performance and video art in the clockwork of the Drohobytsk Town Hall as part of the III Bruno Schultz International Festival "Performance in Clock" (Drohobych), installation, performance "B. N." within the framework of the Week of Actual Art (Lviv). He actively collaborated with the Lviv Academic Theater named after Lesya Kurbas, the National Academic Ukrainian Drama Theater named after M. Zankovetska, the First Ukrainian Theater for Children and Youth, the National Academic Theater named after I. Franko (Kyiv).

He was the curator of the "Week of Current Art" project (Lviv) in 2008-2009 and curator of the parallel program of the First International Art Festival "Fort. Missia" (the village of Popovichi, Mostysky District, Lviv Region) in 2009.

In 2009, he presented the performance "Shachivnytsia" as part of the "L2" project (Lublin), as well as during the Contemporary Art Week in Lviv. Installed graphics "Bird therapy" in "Dzyza".

2008 performances
Performances: "Pobutova ekskursiya" and "Svyashchenna Poltva" at the project "Art Depot," Lviv.
Performance: "Deklaratsiya porozhnechi" at "Gogolfest," Kyiv.
Installation performance: "B. N." at the week of Contemporary Art Lviv.

References

Sources

 Офіційний сайт В.Кауфмана (укр.)
 Інтерв'ю В. Кауфмана
 Інтерв'ю В. Кауфмана // Сайт «Дзиґи»
 The Ukrainian Weekly

Ukrainian painters
1957 births
Living people
People from Karaganda